Mikko Jokela (born March 4, 1980) is a Finnish former professional ice hockey defenceman. Jokela played one game in the National Hockey League for the Vancouver Canucks in 2003.

Playing career
Jokela started his ice hockey career with the KalPa junior team, and was selected 96th overall in the 1998 NHL Entry Draft by the New Jersey Devils He represented various SM-liiga teams before he signed with the Devils for the 2001–02 NHL season. Jokela spent the season with the AHL Albany River Rats, and after starting the next season in the AHL, he was traded to the Vancouver Canucks for Steve Kariya, where he played his only NHL game in the 2002–03 season.

After another year with the Canucks' AHL affiliate Manitoba Moose, Jokela returned to Finland and signed with HPK. He was made team captain for the 2005–06 season when the team won the SM-liiga championship. In April 2007, he signed a three-year contract with Jokerit. However, he moved to KHL team HC Dynamo Minsk after his second season with Jokerit. After spending the 2009–10 season with Minsk, he took his game to Sweden and joined SHL side Timrå IK for the 2010–11 campaign. In 2011, he embarked on a three-year stint with HIFK in the Finnish Liiga.

On March 21, 2014, Jokela left HIFK after three seasons and signed a two-year contract in returning to captain fellow Finnish Liiga club, KalPa. He served as team captain both years and left for Austria when his contract was up, signing with EC VSV of the EBEL in May 2016.

Midway through his season with VSV, Jokela opted to leave the club and return to Finland with KooKoo of the Liiga, where he opted to end his professional playing career after 20 years.

International play
Jokela made Finland's roster for the 2008 World Championships and also represented his country at the Euro Hockey Tour on several occasions.

Career statistics

Regular season and playoffs

International

References

External links

1980 births
Living people
Albany River Rats players
Anaheim Ducks scouts
Finnish ice hockey defencemen
EC VSV players
HC Dinamo Minsk players
HIFK (ice hockey) players
HPK players
Jokerit players
KalPa players
KooKoo players
Manitoba Moose players
New Jersey Devils draft picks
People from Lappeenranta
SaiPa players
Timrå IK players
Vancouver Canucks players
Sportspeople from South Karelia